QS Virginis (abbreviated QS Vir) is an eclipsing binary system approximately 163 light-years away from the Sun, forming a cataclysmic variable. The system comprises an eclipsing white dwarf and red dwarf that orbit each other every 3.37 hours.

Variability
The eclipsing binary nature of QS Virginis was discovered in 1997 during the Edinburgh-Cape Blue Object Survey for blue stellar objects in the southern hemisphere.

Possible third body
In 2009 the discovery of an extrasolar planet in orbit around the binary star was announced, detected by variations in the timings of the eclipses of the two stars. The planet was announced to have a minimum mass 6.4 times the mass of Jupiter, in an elliptical orbit 4.2 Astronomical Units away from binary.

Subsequent observations revealed that the timings were not following the pattern predicted by the planetary model. While the observed variations in eclipse times may be caused by a third body, the best fit model orbit is for an object with minimum mass 0.05 solar masses (about 50 times the mass of Jupiter) in a highly eccentric 14-year orbit.

See also
 Algol
 HW Virginis
 NN Serpentis
 CM Draconis
 DP Leonis
 NSVS 14256825
 List of extrasolar planets

References

Virgo (constellation)
Eclipsing binaries
Virginis, QS
White dwarfs
M-type main-sequence stars
Hypothetical planetary systems